Eddie Rabbitt is the debut studio album by American country music artist Eddie Rabbitt, released in 1975 under the Elektra Records label. The album produced three singles: "You Get to Me", "Forgive and Forget", and "I Should Have Married You". The latter two both reached the top 15 in country music charts. Also included on the album was "Pure Love", a song written by Rabbitt that had been originally recorded by Ronnie Milsap the previous year.

Track listing

Side A

Track listing

Side B

Chart positions

Singles

References

1975 debut albums
Eddie Rabbitt albums
Elektra Records albums